Izgrev is a village in Blagoevgrad Municipality, in Blagoevgrad Province, Bulgaria. It is situated in the foothills of Rila mountain 1 kilometer southeast of Blagoevgrad. The village was created in 1963 and named Aidarovo. The name was changed to Izgrev in 1987.

Honours
Izgrev Passage in Antarctica is named after the village.

References

Villages in Blagoevgrad Province